Moor Crag (sometimes Moorcrag) is a Grade I listed house near Bowness-on-Windermere in South Lakeland, Cumbria, England, overlooking Windermere. It lies in the north of the parish of Cartmel Fell. It was designed by C. F. A. Voysey in 1898-1899 as a holiday home for J. W.Buckley of Altrincham.

Duncan Simpson in his 1979 work C.F.A. Voysey: an architect of individuality describes Moor Crag as "The single most important house designed by Voysey".

See also

Grade I listed buildings in Cumbria
Listed buildings in Cartmel Fell

References

External links
 Two photographs of Moor Crag

Grade I listed houses
Grade I listed buildings in Cumbria